Lepidogma hyrcanalis is a species of snout moth in the genus Lepidogma. It is known from Iran.

References

Moths described in 1961
Epipaschiinae